ProFTPD (short for Pro FTP daemon) is an FTP server. ProFTPD is Free and open-source software, compatible with Unix-like systems and Microsoft Windows (via Cygwin).
Along with vsftpd and Pure-FTPd, ProFTPD is among the most popular FTP servers in Unix-like environments today. Compared to those, which focus e.g. on simplicity, speed or security, ProFTPD's primary design goal is to be a highly feature rich FTP server, exposing a large amount of configuration options to the user.

Supported platforms

 AIX
 BSD/OS
 DG/UX
 Digital Unix
 FreeBSD
 HP/UX
 IRIX
 Linux for IBM S/390, zSeries
 Linux
 Mac OS X
 NetBSD
 OpenBSD
 SCO
 Solaris
 SunOS
 Windows (via Cygwin)

Configuration and features
ProFTPD includes a number of options that are not available with many other FTP daemons. The configuration of ProFTPD is performed in a single main configuration file called /etc/proftpd/proftpd.conf. Due to its similarities to the configuration file of Apache HTTP Server it is intuitively understandable to someone who uses this popular web server.

Some of the most noticeable features are:
 Per directory ".ftpaccess" configuration similar to Apache's ".htaccess"
 Multiple virtual FTP servers and anonymous FTP services
 Runs either as a stand-alone server or from inetd/xinetd, depending on system load
 Anonymous FTP root directories do not require any specific directory structure, system binaries or other system files
 No SITE EXEC command, which in modern Internet environments represent a security issue
 Hidden directories and files, based on Unix-style permissions or user/group ownership
 Runs as a configurable non-privileged user in stand-alone mode in order to decrease chances of attacks which might exploit its "root" abilities
 Logging and utmp/wtmp support.
 Shadow password suite support, including support for expired accounts
 Modular design, allowing server to be extended easily with modules. Modules have been written for SQL databases, LDAP servers, SSL/TLS encryption, RADIUS support, etc.
 IPv6 support

Graphical user interface

ProFTPD comes with a command-line interface (CLI) only, but there are several third-party  Graphical user interfaces (GUI) existing for ProFTP for users who prefer this to the CLI, or like to use a combination of both. Especially when it comes for example to real-time monitoring of current user actions and file transmissions, a GUI can be very helpful and superior to the CLI. Some existing GUIs for ProFTPD are (selection):
 GAdmin-ProFTPD, a GTK+ front end for GNOME and KDE, as a part of the GAdmintools collection
 ProFTPD Admin
 ProFTPD PHP/MySQL administration tool
 ProFTPD Administrator

See also

 FTP server
 Comparison of FTP server software
 List of FTP server software
 List of SFTP server software

References

External links
 Official website
 An overview of existing GUIs for ProFTPD
 French tutorial for install ProFTPD with Debian Linux

FTP server software
Free server software
Free file transfer software
FTP server software for Linux
Unix Internet software
Free software programmed in C